The 55th Space Weather  Squadron is an inactive United States Air Force unit. It was last assigned to the 50th Operations Group at Schriever Air Force Base, Colorado, where it was inactivated on 16 July 2002. 

The squadron was first activated as the 655th Bombardment Squadron in 1944.  After training in the United States, the squadron moved to the Pacific Theater in the spring of 1945, where, as the 55th Reconnaissance Squadron, it provided weather reconnaissance for Boeing B-29 Superfortress strategic bombing campaign against Japan.  After V-J Day, the squadron returned to the United States and conducted weather reconnaissance until October 1947, when it was inactivated and its personnel and equipment transferred to another unit.

The squadron was reactivated at McClellan Air Force Base, California as the 55th Strategic Reconnaissance Squadron.  Redesignated the 55th Weather Reconnaissance Squadron in 1954, the squadron flew weather reconnaissance missions until 1953, except for a brief inactive period in the early 1960s.

It was activated in 1997 under its most recent name, when it absorbed the resources of the 50th Weather Squadron, which had replaced the Air Force Space Forecast Center in 1994.

History

World War II

The squadron was first organized in August 1944 at Will Rogers Field, Oklahoma as the 655th Bombardment Squadron and equipped with Consolidated B-24 Liberator aircraft. It trained under Third Air Force until March 1945, when it deployed to Guam, where it was attached to XXI Bomber Command. From Guam, the squadron, now designated the 55th Reconnaissance Squadron,  provided weather reconnaissance for Twentieth Air Force Boeing B-29 Superfortress raids on Japan in the Western Pacific theater.

Cold War weather reconnaissance operations
The squadron returned to the United States in March 1946 as an element of Air Weather Service, although it initially had no aircraft assigned and only a few personnel.   In mid-July 1946, the squadron moved to Morrison Field, Florida, where the 1st Air Weather Group (Provisional) supervised the conversion of the 54th and 55th Squadrons to operate weather reconnaissance versions of the B-29 Superfortress over the next year.   In June 1947, the squadron moved to Fairfield-Suisun Army Air Field, California, where it became responsible for weather reconnaissance operations in the United States.  The following month, it began to fly daily missions over the eastern Pacific Ocean.  The squadron inactivated in October 1947, transferring its personnel and equipment to the 374th Reconnaissance Squadron, which was simultaneously activated.

This action was, in essence, reversed in February 1951 when the squadron was reactivated as the 55th Strategic Reconnaissance Squadron, replacing the 374th Squadron, which had moved to McClellan Air Force Base, California. The squadron flew weather reconnaissance missions over the northern Pacific and parts of the Arctic Ocean, using WB-29s.  It also supported nuclear weapons testing by monitoring radioactive clouds and taking atmospheric samples. In 1953, the squadron was assigned to the 9th Weather Group.

The following year, the squadron upgraded to Boeing WB-50 Superfortresses.  It tested WB-50 aircraft flying long-duration missions over 24 hours in length and trained crews for other weather squadrons.  The same year, it was renamed the 55th Weather Reconnaissance Squadron. The 55th provided weather data for transoceanic fighter deployments, photographic reconnaissance for testing experimental Corona reconnaissance satellite imagery, and surveillance for space flight recoveries. In 1957 it added its first jet aircraft, the Boeing WB-47 Stratojet, to its inventory.   The squadron added the northwestern Atlantic Ocean to its area of responsibility in the late 1950s.  It tracked Hurricanes Dot and Donna in 1959 and 1960.  From July 1958 it operated detachments in Alaska, Hawaii and Washington.  These detachments were equipped and manned from resources of the 57th and 58th Weather Reconnaissance Squadrons, which were inactivated to free up funds for the Air Force's intercontinental ballistic missile program.  It continued operations from these locations until it was inactivated in July 1961.

The squadron's inactivation was brief and it was again organized at McClellan AFB in January 1962, as Air Weather Service centralized its reconnaissance units under the 9th Weather Reconnaissance Group.  It added Lockheed WC-130 aircraft to its previous mix of WB-50 and WB-47 aircraft  The following year it added Martin RB-57F Canberra aircraft modified for high altitude operation and retired its WB-50s. The squadron's mission involved atmospheric sampling and radiation detection work in support of nuclear test monitoring. The Canberras were transferred in 1964 and the WC-130s in 1965, but the Boeing WC-135 Constant Phoenix
flew weather reconnaissance and atmospheric sampling missions over the Pacific and Arctic until 1993.  The WB-47s were retired in 1969. In 1986, the squadron monitored atmospheric radiation in Europe after Chernobyl nuclear accident in the Soviet Union. In 1988 and 1989, it tested special photographic equipment for Strategic Defense Initiative research.  The squadron inactivated in 1993 with the end of the Cold War.

Space weather unit
The squadron was redesignated the 55th Space Weather Squadron and activated under Space Command in March 1997, absorbing the resources of the 50th Weather Squadron and acting as the Air Force's space forecast center.  The squadron was inactivated in July 2002.

Lineage 
 Constituted as the 655th Bombardment Squadron, Heavy on 11 August 1944
 Activated on 21 August 1944
 Redesignated 55th Reconnaissance Squadron, Long Range, Weather on 16 June 1945
 Redesignated 55th Reconnaissance Squadron, Very Long Range, Weather on 27 November 1945
 Inactivated on 15 October 1947
 Redesignated 55th Strategic Reconnaissance Squadron, Medium, Weather on 22 January 1951
 Activated on 21 February 1951
 Redesignated 55th Weather Reconnaissance Squadron on 15 February 1954
 Discontinued, and inactivated on 8 July 1961
 Activated on 12 October 1961 (not organized)
 Organized on 8 January 1962
 Inactivated on 1 October 1993
 Redesignated 55th Space Weather Squadron on 1 March 1997
 Activated on 17 March 1997
 Inactivated 16 July 2002

Assignments 

 Third Air Force, 21 August 1944
 III Tactical Air Command, 1 October 1944
 III Tactical Air Division, by November 1944
 Twentieth Air Force, 11 April 1945 (attached to XXI Bomber Command)
 311th Reconnaissance Wing, 27 November 1945 (attached to U.S. Army Strategic Air Forces)
 Air Transport Command, 13 March 1946 (attached to U.S. Army Strategic Air Forces)
 Air Weather Service, 20 March 1946 – 15 October 1947
 Air Weather Service, 21 February 1951
 9th Weather Group, 20 April 1953 – 8 July 1961
 Military Air Transport Service, 12 October 1961 (not organized)
 9th Weather Reconnaissance Group, 8 January 1962
 9th Weather Reconnaissance Wing, 8 July 1965
 41st Rescue and Weather Reconnaissance Wing, 1 September 1975
 Air Rescue Service, 1 August 1989
 60th Operations Group, 1 February 1993 – 1 October 1993
 50th Operations Group, 17 March 1997 – 16 July 2002

Stations 

 Will Rogers Field, Oklahoma, 21 August 1944 – 5 March 1945
 Depot Field (later Harmon Field), Guam, Mariana Islands, 11 April 1945 – 28 February 1946
 Buckley Field, Colorado, 20 March 1946
 Langley Field, Virginia, 9 May 1946
 Morrison Field, Florida, c. 16 July 1946
 Fairfield-Suisun Army Air Field, California, 1 June–15 October 1947
 McClellan Air Force Base, California, 21 February 1951 – 8 July 1961
 Detachment 1, Ladd Air Force Base, Alaska, 1 July 1958 – 8 July 1961
 Detachment 2, Hickam Air Force Base, Hawaii, 1 July 1958 – 8 July 1961
 Detachment 3, McChord Air Force Base, Washington, 1 July 1958 – 8 July 1961
 McClellan Air Force Base, California, 8 January 1962 – 1 October 1993
 Falcon Air Force Base (later Schriever Air Force Base), Colorado, 17 March 1997 – 16 July 2002

Aircraft 

 Douglas A-20 Havoc, 1944
 Consolidated B-24 Liberator, 1944–1945
 Boeing B-29 Superfortress, 1946–1947
 Douglas C-47 Skytrain
 Boeing WB-29 Superfortress, 1951–1955
 Boeing TB-29 Superfortress, 1951–1955
 Boeing WB-50 Superfortress, 1954–1961, 1962–1963
 Boeing TB-50 Superfortress, 1958–1960
 Douglas C-54 Skymaster, 1958-1961
 Boeing WB-47 Stratojet, 1957–1961, 1962–1969
 Martin JB-57 Canberra, 1960–1961, 1962-1963
 Martin RB-57F Canberra, 1963–1964
 Lockheed C-130 Hercules, 1962–1965
 Lockheed WC-130 Hercules, 1962-1965, 1970–1975
 Lockheed HC-130 Hercules, 1975
 Boeing C-135, 1965
 Boeing WC-135 Constant Phoenix, 1965–1993

Awards and campaigns

References

Notes
 Explanatory notes

 Citations

Bibliography

  (link to Google Books extract)

External links
 
 

055